SM UB-108 was a German Type UB III submarine or U-boat in the German Imperial Navy during World War I. She was commissioned into the German Imperial Navy on 1 March 1918 as SM UB-108.

UB-108 was lost in July 1918 in the English Channel.

Construction

She was built by Blohm & Voss of Hamburg and following just under a year of construction, launched at Hamburg on 21 July 1917. UB-108 was commissioned early the next year under the command of Oblt.z.S. Wilhelm Amberger. Like all Type UB III submarines, UB-108 carried 10 torpedoes and was armed with a  deck gun. UB-108 had a displacement of  while surfaced and  when submerged. Her engines enabled her to travel at  when surfaced and  when submerged.

Summary of raiding history

References

Notes

Citations

Bibliography 

 

German Type UB III submarines
World War I submarines of Germany
U-boats commissioned in 1918
1917 ships
Ships built in Hamburg
U-boats sunk in 1918
Maritime incidents in 1918
World War I shipwrecks in the English Channel
Ships lost with all hands